Fachbach is a municipality in the district of Rhein-Lahn, in Rhineland-Palatinate, in western Germany. It belongs to the association community of Bad Ems-Nassau.

History
Fachbach got its name from the Fachbach creek (literally: wicker basket creek). On the official website it is stated, that the inhabitants fished trouts in former times with a wicker basket they called "Fach". The creek was first mentioned in 959 A.D., the village itself 1371 AD.

Culture and Sightseeing
Recommendable is the "Nieverner Hütte", an iron works on the Fachbacher island Oberau in the Lahn river. In former times it belongs to Nievern and is a recognized industrial monument. The island Oberau was the location of the Gustav Fudickar "Schlafwohl" (literally: Sleepwell) upholstery and mattress factory (founded 1885) between the 60s and 70s. The Fudickar upholstery and mattress factory built the Fachbacher district "Auf der Oberau" and had patents of special spring mattresses. Today, the buildings on the island Oberau are used by various small businesses. In the forest of Fachbach fossils were found and the fauna shows many various butterflies, including very rare specimens.

References

Municipalities in Rhineland-Palatinate
Rhein-Lahn-Kreis